Pyvesa is a river of Biržai district municipality, Panevėžys County, northern Lithuania.

It is a right tributary of the Mūša.

References

Rivers of Lithuania
Biržai District Municipality